Apache Casino Hotel or Fort Sill Apache Casino is operated and owned by the Fort Sill Apache Tribe of Oklahoma. The casino and hotel is located within Comanche County bearing east of Interstate 44 in Lawton, Oklahoma. In January 1999, the Native American gaming establishment was introduced to Southwestern Oklahoma within the Kiowa-Comanche-Apache Reservation lands. The Apache gaming enterprise originated as a membrane structure or tension fabric building housing Class II or Class III casino gaming and slot machines.

Since 2000 Renovations
The Apache casino has received substantial renovations since the introduction of the entertainment and gaming enterprise in 1999;

See also
 American Gaming Association
 History of gambling in the United States
 Indian Gaming Regulatory Act
 National Indian Gaming Commission

References

Further reading

External links
 
 
 
 
 

Hotels established in 1999
Casinos in Oklahoma
Casino hotels
Hotels in Oklahoma
Casinos completed in 1999
1999 establishments in Oklahoma